A list of films produced by the Bollywood film industry based in Mumbai in 1933:

A

B-D

E-K

L-N

O-R

S-Z

References

External links
Bollywood films of 1933 at IMDb

1933
Bollywood
Films, Bollywood